Statistics of Qatar Stars League for the 1999–2000 season.

Overview
It was contested by 9 teams, and Al-Sadd Sports Club won the championship.

League standings

References
Qatar - List of final tables (RSSSF)

Qatar
1999–2000 in Qatari football